A gnome (Greek: γνώμη gnome, from γιγνώσκειν gignoskein "to know") is a type of saying, especially an aphorism or a maxim, designed to provide instruction in a compact form (usually in hexameter).

The term gnome was introduced by Klaus Berger in the Formgeschichte des Neuen Testaments. He used this traditional term from the antique rhetoric and attempted to identify this rhetorical method in the New Testament.

Links 

 Adage
 Analogy
 Aphorism
 Epigram

 Epitome
 Gnomic poetry
 Maxim (saying)
 Metaphor

 Parable
 Proverb
 Saying
 Simile

Further reading

References

Rhetoric